The 2011 South Australian National Football League (SANFL) Grand Final saw Woodville-West Torrens defeat the Central District Bulldogs by 3 points to claim the club's third premiership victory.

The match was played on Sunday 9 October 2011 at Football Park in front of a crowd of 25,234.

References 

SANFL Grand Finals
Sanfl Grand Final, 2011